Simone Bolelli and Guillermo Durán were the defending champions but only Durán chose to defend his title, partnering Tim Sandkaulen. Durán lost in the quarterfinals to Szymon Walków and Jan Zieliński.

Walków and Zieliński won the title after defeating Ivan and Matej Sabanov 6–4, 4–6, [10–4] in the final.

Seeds

Draw

References

External links
 Main draw

Sparkassen Open - Doubles
2021 Doubles